Hermelindo Alberti (27 February 1925 – 8 December 2012) was an Argentine athlete who competed in the 1948 Summer Olympics in the 400m hurdles and the 4 × 400 m relay, in both events he finished 3rd in the first round and failed to advance.

References

1925 births
2012 deaths
Argentine male hurdlers
Argentine male sprinters
Olympic athletes of Argentina
Athletes (track and field) at the 1948 Summer Olympics